Wagener is a German surname. Notable people with the surname include:

 Ana Wagener (born 1962), a Spanish actress
 Carl Wagener (1901–1988), a Wehrmacht General during World War II
 David Douglas Wagener (1792–1860), a member of the U.S. House of Representatives from Pennsylvania
 Frank Wagener (born 1952), a chairman of the boards of directors of the Luxembourg Stock Exchange
 George Wagener, a New York politician
 Hermann Wagener (1815–1889), a Prussian jurist
 Henry Wagener (1891-1979), American farmer and politician
 Hilde Wagener (1904–1992), a German-born actress who settled in Austria
 Jack Wagener (1905–1986), an English cricketer 
 Joachim Heinrich Wilhelm Wagener (1782–1861), a German banker and patron of the arts
 Johann Andreas Wagener, the forty-third mayor of Charleston, South Carolina, United States
 Maximilian Wagener (born 1995), a German football player
 Michael Wagener (born 1949), a German record producer
 Otto Wagener (1888–1971), a Nazi major general and Hitler's economic advisor
 Richard Wagener (born 1944), an American wood engraver 
 Sigbert Wagener (1919–2004), a German Capuchin priest and entomologist
 T.L. Wagener, an American playwright and screenwriter
 Werner Wagener (1894–?), a World War I German pilot

German-language surnames